PowerBar is an American brand of energy bars and other related products including sports drinks, gels, and the Pria bars targeted at women. The former company had been established in 1986, being then acquired by Nestlé.

History

The PowerBar company was founded by Brian Maxwell, a Canadian athlete and entrepreneur, along with Jennifer Biddulph, and Mike McCollum. They started in Maxwell's kitchen, where they formulated the recipe using the knowledge of Jennifer Biddulph, a nutritionist. The two would eventually marry. They used $55,000 in cash to launch the company in 1986 in Berkeley, California. This was the first "energy bar" for use during competition by endurance athletes, such as ultra marathoners, and cyclists. They eventually acquired a headquarters building in downtown Berkeley.

The company eventually reached $150 million in sales before being purchased by Nestlé in 2000 for $375 million. In February 2007, PowerBar moved its headquarters from Berkeley, California, to the Nestlé headquarters in Glendale, California.

On February 3, 2014, Post Holdings announced it had reached an agreement to acquire PowerBar, Musashi and related worldwide assets from Nestlé. In 2021, PowerBar regained control of their brand and became a registered trademark of Premier Nutrition Company, LLC.

See also 
 
 List of food companies

References

External links 

 
 "PowerBar founder collapses" (20 March 2004), San Francisco Chronicle
 Center.spoke.com: Mike McCollum, Board Member

1986 establishments in California
American brands
American companies established in 1986
Companies based in Berkeley, California
Companies based in Glendale, California
Dietary supplements
Energy food products
Food and drink companies based in California
Food and drink companies established in 1986
Food manufacturers of the United States
Post Consumer Brands brands